The Greater Sudbury Public Library is a public library system in Greater Sudbury, Ontario, Canada.

The library system has 13 branches throughout the city. The main branch is called "Mackenzie" and it is located on Mackenzie Street in the downtown core. Additional branches are located in the communities of Azilda, Capreol, Chelmsford, Coniston, Copper Cliff, Dowling, Garson, Hanmer, Lively, Lo-Ellen, New Sudbury, and Onaping. A non-lending reference branch was formerly also located at Tom Davies Square, but this moved back to the Mackenzie location in 1998 after renovations expanded the Mackenzie building.

The largest library in the City of Greater Sudbury is the Mackenzie Library Main Branch. It provides access to bilingual business directories, phone books, maps, government publications, and a vast selection of books. The Reference Collection also has three special collections in its lower level: Genealogy, the Mary C. Shantz Local History Collection, and Canadian Legal Materials. The Makerspace located in the Mackenzie Library Main Branch offers sewing machines, 3D printers, and other tools for public use.

The South End Library branch was demolished in 2009 after a broken sewer lead to sections of the building's floor sinking by over 35cm and the building was declared unsafe. A new branch, designed by Yallowega Bélanger Salach Architecture, was built in the same location with a $4.9 million budget and opened in 2012. The new building includes outdoor reading and performance areas, spaces for children and teens, and meeting rooms.

Branches

See also
Ontario Public Libraries
Ask Ontario

References

External links

Buildings and structures in Greater Sudbury
Culture of Greater Sudbury
Public libraries in Ontario
Education in Greater Sudbury